SS Usoga is a disused cargo and passenger Lake Victoria ferry in East Africa.

History 

Bow, McLachlan and Company of Paisley in Renfrewshire, Scotland built Usoga and her sister ship  in 1913. They were "knock down" vessels; that is, they were bolted together in the shipyard at Paisley, all the parts marked with numbers, disassembled into many hundreds of parts and transported in kit form by sea to Kenya for reassembly.

Usoga entered service on the lake in 1915 and was a troop ship during the First World War East African Campaign. After the Armistice she entered civilian service as a Lake Victoria ferry.

In 1975 the East African Railways and Harbours Corporation laid her up at the Lake Victoria port of Kisumu. In the 1990s she sank at the quayside and she was still there in 2006 and 2007, along with the slightly earlier  from the same fleet.

References

External links
 — photos of various former EAR&H ships lying derelict at Kisumu, including SS Usoga and 

1913 ships
Ships built on the River Clyde
Lake Victoria